Axel August Berg (8 July 1938 – 12 April 2020) was a Norwegian football winger.

He played for Lyn between 1955 and 1965 and represented Norway as a youth, under-21 and senior international.

He grew up at Majorstua. A one-club man, he remained in the Lyn milieu his entire life. He died in April 2020.

References

1938 births
2020 deaths
Footballers from Oslo
Norwegian footballers
Lyn Fotball players
Norway youth international footballers
Norway under-21 international footballers
Norway international footballers
Association football wingers